The Cikopo–Palimanan Toll Road (shortened to Cipali Toll Road) is a toll road that connects Cikopo with Palimanan in the province of West Java, Indonesia. Being a part of the Trans-Java Toll Road, it was opened on 13 June 2015. At  in length, it is the longest toll road in Java. The toll road is also  shorter than the traditional North Coastal Road of West Java.

Sections
 Section I, Cikopo–Kalijati
 Section II, Kalijati–Subang
 Section III, Subang–Cikedung
 Section IV, Cikedung–Kertajati
 Section V, Kertajati–Sumberjaya
 Section VI, Sumberjaya–Palimanan

History
The project is estimated at Rp12.562 trillion ($1.4 billion) and is owned by a joint venture company PT Lintas Marga Sedaya with portion 55 percent is owned by Plus Expressways Berhad and 45 percent is owned by PT Bhaskara Utama for 35 years concession. 
In July 2012, 95 percent of land acquisition has been done and bank loan commitment of Rp9 trillion has been got, but the loan only can be withdrawn after 100 percent of land acquisition has been finished. Inline with already finished of all land acquisitions, in September 2012, twenty two banks agreed to initial disburse the fund of the project. At end of January 2014, 15 percent physical project has been finished and predicted the toll road will be operated at end of 2014 or early 2015. On 29 October 2014, PT Lintas Marga Sedaya announced that the toll road would be completed by June 2015.

Naming controversy
Purwakarta Regent, Dedi Mulyadi, protested the naming of the Cikampek - Palimanan toll road due to the location of the toll road segment is located in Cikopo, Purwakarta Regency, instead of Cikampek which is located at Karawang Regency. He pointed out past mistakes in naming the Jakarta-Cikampek toll road. The location of the interchanges are geographically located in Cikopo, Purwakarta. Finally, during the inauguration in June 2015 the name of this toll road was changed from the Cikampek-Palimanan Toll Road (Cikapali) to Cikopo–Palimanan Toll Road (Cipali).

Opening
On 13 June 2015, Cikopo–Palimanan toll road was opened by Indonesian president, Joko Widodo. Since then, Jakarta and Cirebon are now directly connected by toll road.

Accidents
Within six months of being inaugurated by President Jokowi, there have been 88 accidents in this Cikopo-Palimanan toll causing a number of people to be killed and injured. According to Ofyar Z Tamin, Transport Expert from Bandung Institute of Technology, argued that there are 3 possible major factors that caused accidents and incidents in this toll road:
Design flaws
Although Tamin argued that this factor isn't as significant as it involves Planning Consultant in the design.
Vehicles that are Being used
Tamin argued that most vehicles who were involved in the accidents can range from brake failures or overloaded capacity.
Driver's condition
Tamin argued that drivers who are feeling tired or drowsy or even those who are chasing schedules, are forcing themselves to drive in unfit conditions.
He further explained that one of the efforts that can be done to reduce the high number of accidents on the Cipali Toll Road is to increase the number of signs, markers, and road signs, including warning signs.

Facilities

Exits
Note: The number on the exits is based on the distance from the western terminus of the Jakarta-Cikampek Toll Road, while the distance numbers are based on the distance from the western terminus of this toll road only

*Although Kertajati International Airport will be connected directly to Cisumdawu Toll Road, the design of construction might won't realize the plan since the Kertajati Airport Link is being constructed in the place where Kertajati Trumpet Exit is. The number of km is just the assumption, regarding the safety connections in the expressway.

Rest areas

Future 
Due to the operational of Jakarta-Cikampek Elevated Toll Road (renamed as Sheikh Mohammed bin Zayed Skyway in April 2021), the government will expand this toll road gradually to 3-4 lanes per direction from the current 2, with the priority seeks for Cikampek terminus, to handle more traffic influx using this toll road. The toll road is believed to be overcap in the near term since the operation of the said elevated toll road.

The Cisumdawu Toll Road also connects this toll road to Bandung and Kertajati International Airport in the Kertajati proper area. Patimban Deep Sea Port is planned to be connected by Patimban Access Toll Road to Cipali Toll Road.

References

Toll roads in Indonesia
Toll roads in Java
Transport in West Java